Kiruna Central Station is a railway station located on the Iron Ore Line in Kiruna, Sweden. The station is served by up to three daily services northwards on the Iron Ore Line to Narvik Station in Norway. Southwards, the station is served by two daily services to Luleå Central Station and Stockholm Central Station, operated by SJ, and two (week-ends) or three (weekdays) daily services to Luleå Central Station operated by Norrtåg.

In 2013 the a new provisional station in the north east of the town took over the traffic, as the old station is in the area of the iron ore mine.
The old station and the station hotel (stations hotellet) was demolished in 2017.

References

Railway stations on the Iron Ore Line
Kiruna
Buildings and structures in Norrbotten County